Shannon is a town in Lee County, Mississippi. The population was 1,496 at the 2020 Census.

Shannon is located on Mississippi Highway 145, west of U.S. Route 45. Chiwapa Creek flows south of the town.

History
The town is named for Samuel Shannon, who purchased land at that location from Chickasaw Chief Itawamba in the early 1800s, then built a cabin and a farm.  More settlers arrived following the Treaty of Pontotoc, which ceding Chickasaw land in exchange for financial compensation.

In the early 1800s, Constantine Shannon brought strawberry plants from Shannon to Plant City, Florida, enabling the creation of a multimillion-dollar industry in Plant City.

A church was established in 1839.

The original townsite was north of the present location, and was moved when the Mobile and Ohio Railroad was constructed through the community in the 1850s.  Shannon was incorporated in 1860 and a post office was established.  Shannon was originally part of Itawamba County, but became part of Lee county after that county formed in 1866.

Commerce expanded in Shannon, and there was a corn elevator, grain elevator, and three cotton gins.  Around 1915, Coca-Cola was bottled in Shannon.

The old Francis Store, one of the town's original buildings, is now a restaurant owned by the Town of Shannon.

Gay bar controversy
From 1998 until 2007, Shannon was home to Rumors, the gay bar featured in the Kevin Smith/Malcolm Ingram film Small Town Gay Bar.   In 2013, after a hiatus, local businesspeople tried to reopen the bar. The town refused. This refusal led to a lawsuit claiming the town had refused the application out of concern of having a gay bar in its jurisdiction.

A message on the town's website reads: "we take pride in being on the quiet side of county with our relaxed country living where traditions of family, faith, and brotherly love make up who we are today."

Geography
Shannon is located at  (34.116826, -88.701520).

Demographics

2020 census

As of the 2020 United States Census, there were 1,496 people, 700 households, and 416 families residing in the town.

2000 census
As of the census of 2000, there were 1,657 people, 632 households, and 437 families residing in the town. The population density was 403.5 people per square mile (155.7/km). There were 691 housing units at an average density of 168.3 per square mile (64.9/km). The racial makeup of the town was 44.42% White, 54.19% African American, 0.06% Native American, 0.12% Asian, 0.84% from other races, and 0.36% from two or more races. Hispanic or Latino of any race were 1.57% of the population.

There were 632 households, out of which 40.2% had children under the age of 18 living with them, 38.4% were married couples living together, 23.7% had a female householder with no husband present, and 30.7% were non-families. 27.1% of all households were made up of individuals, and 7.9% had someone living alone who was 65 years of age or older. The average household size was 2.62 and the average family size was 3.18.

In the town, the population was spread out, with 32.0% under the age of 18, 10.6% from 18 to 24, 29.5% from 25 to 44, 19.1% from 45 to 64, and 8.8% who were 65 years of age or older. The median age was 29 years. For every 100 females, there were 94.9 males. For every 100 females age 18 and over, there were 91.3 males.

The median income for a household in the town was $29,773, and the median income for a family was $30,848. Males had a median income of $25,313 versus $20,149 for females. The per capita income for the town was $13,592. About 16.3% of families and 18.4% of the population were below the poverty line, including 21.6% of those under age 18 and 21.4% of those age 65 or over.

Economy
In 2005, General Atomics opened a $38 million manufacturing and test facility in Shannon.  Much of the work at the facility is for the U.S. Navy, including advanced launch and recovery systems for aircraft carriers.

The Natchez Trace Parkway RV Park is located in Shannon.

Education
The Town of Shannon is served by the Lee County School District.

Notable people
 Cousins Bertha Barbee and Norma Barbee of The Velvelettes were born in Shannon.
 Guy Bush, professional baseball player; retired to Shannon.
 George Washington Forbes, co-founder of the Boston Guardian.
 Romaro Miller, former National Football League quarterback
 Rickey W. Thompson, member of the Mississippi House of Representatives

References

External links
 Town of Shannon

Towns in Lee County, Mississippi
Towns in Mississippi
Towns in Tupelo micropolitan area
2013 in LGBT history